Satherium is an extinct genus of otters that lived in North America during the Pliocene and Pleistocene. Two species are known, Satherium piscinarium and Satherium ingens.

S. piscinarium was originally classified as a species of Lutra. The giant otter of South America is considered the closest living relative of this genus.

References

Otters
Prehistoric mustelids
Prehistoric mammals of North America
Pliocene mammals of North America
Pleistocene mammals of North America
Prehistoric mammal genera